Greater La Serena is a Chilean conurbation that includes Coquimbo and La Serena communes in the Coquimbo Region.  It has a population of 412,845, according to the 2012 census, and thus is the fourth largest metropolitan area in Chile, after Santiago, Greater Valparaiso and  Greater Concepcion.  Its population has doubled over the last 20 years, mainly because of economic growth and the development of tourism in its largest city, La Serena.  As with many Chilean conurbations, it has an industrial and port sector, as well as a residential and tourist sector in which the beaches are the main attraction.

Populated places in Elqui Province
La Serena
Coasts of Coquimbo Region